Riley Township may refer to the following places in the U.S. state of Michigan:

 Riley Township, Clinton County, Michigan
 Riley Township, St. Clair County, Michigan

See also
 Riley Township (disambiguation)

Michigan township disambiguation pages